Zoltán Bergendi (born 21 March 1969 in Šaľa) is a Hungarian-Slovak former handball player who competed in the 1992 Summer Olympics.

References

1969 births
Living people
Slovak male handball players
Olympic handball players of Czechoslovakia
Czechoslovak male handball players
Handball players at the 1992 Summer Olympics
Hungarians in Slovakia
Sportspeople from Šaľa